Danish national road 9 (Danish: Primærrute 9) is part of the Danish national road network. It runs between Odense on Funen and Nykøbing Falster on Falster  by way of Svendborg, Tåsinge, Siø and Langeland, and  involves a ferry crossing between Langeland and Lolland.

Route
The section of National road 9 between Odense and Svendborg follows the Svendborg Motorway. The route then continues across the islands of Tåsinge and Langeland to the small town of Spodsbjerg where there is a ferry service to Tårs on Lolland.

On Lolland, National road 9 continues east, joining Sydmotorvejen ("The South Motorway") just before Maribo and leaving it again at Sakskøbing. It then crosses the Frederick IX Bridge to Falster before reaching Nykøbing Falster.

Motorway Section

 Odense 
 11 Årslev  
 12 Ringe N 
 13 Ringe C 
|  Groven/Dynden
 14 Kværndrup 
 15 Kirkeby
 16 Svendborg N

References 

Roads in Denmark
Transport in Funen